Kilcummin is a village in County Kerry, Ireland, about  north-east of Killarney. The population was 435 at the 2016 census. Kilcummin GAA Club was formed in 1910 and competes in gaelic football. Seán Kelly, currently an MEP and formerly GAA president, was born in Kilcummin.

References

Towns and villages in County Kerry